Orans, a loanword from Medieval Latin orans translated as "one who is praying or pleading", also orant or orante, as well as lifting up holy hands, is a posture or bodily attitude of prayer, usually standing, with the elbows close to the sides of the body and with the hands outstretched sideways, palms up. The orans posture of prayer has a Scriptural basis in : "I desire, then, that in every place the men should pray, lifting up holy hands without anger or argument" (NRSV). It was common in early Christianity and can frequently be seen in early Christian art, being advised by several early Church Fathers, who saw it as "the outline of the cross". In modern times, the orans position is still preserved in Oriental Orthodoxy, as when Coptic Christian believers pray the seven canonical hours of the Agpeya at fixed prayer times; The orans also occurs within parts of the Catholic, Oriental Orthodox, Eastern Orthodox, Lutheran, and Anglican liturgies, Pentecostal and charismatic worship, and the ascetical practices of some religious groups.

History
The orans posture is widespread in the art of the Ancient Near East, both in the Levant and in Egypt, from at least the Late Bronze Age. It was in origin a gesture of supplication or submission shown towards a deity (or the image of a deity) upon entering a temple.
It has been argued that the gesture was adopted by Early Christianity from Second Temple Judaism.

The biblical ordinance of lifting hands up in prayer was advised by many early Christian apologists, including Marcus Minucius Felix, Clement of Rome, Clement of Alexandria and Tertullian. Christians saw the position as representing the posture of Christ on the Cross; therefore, it was the favorite of early Christians. Until the ninth century, the posture was sometimes adopted by entire congregations while celebrating the Eucharist. In Oriental Orthodoxy, Coptic Christian believers pray the seven canonical hours of the Agpeya at fixed prayer times in the orans position while standing. In Western Christianity, by the twelfth century, however, the joining of hands began to replace the orans posture as the preferred position for prayer. 

The orans posture has continued to be used at certain points in the liturgies of the Roman Catholic and Eastern Orthodox and Churches. In the Catholic Church, Masses in the Latin liturgical rites see the celebrating priest prays the orations, the canon, and the Lord's Prayer in the gesture of orant; in the Maronite Church's Holy Qurbana, the congregation together with the priest lift up their hands in the orans posture during various parts of the liturgy, such as the anaphora and Lord's Prayer.
The orans gesture survived the Reformation and was preserved in the liturgy of the  Lutheran and Anglican Churches, where they are no longer universally used, having been omitted from the  Scottish Liturgy of 1970.

The orans posture experienced a revival within Pentecostalism and Charismatic Christianity under the umbrella of the contemporary worship movement of the mid-20th century.

Depictions in art

Orans was common in early Sumerian cultures: "...it appears that Sumerian people might have a statue carved to represent themselves and do their worshipping for them - in their place, as a stand in. An inscription on one such statue translates, 'It offers prayers.' Another inscription says, 'Statue, say unto my king (god)..." The custom of praying in antiquity with outstretched, raised arms was common to both Jews and Gentiles, and indeed the iconographic type of the Orans was itself strongly influenced by classic representations.  But the meaning of the orans of Christian art is quite different from that of its prototypes.

Numerous Biblical figures, for instance, depicted in the catacombs of Rome  — Noah, Abraham, Isaac, Shadrach, Meshach and Abednego, and Daniel in the lion's den — are pictured asking the Lord to deliver the soul of the person on whose tombs they are depicted as he once delivered the particular personage represented.  But besides these Biblical orans figures there exist in the catacombs many ideal figures (153 in all) in the ancient attitude of prayer, representing the deceased's soul in heaven, praying for their friends on earth.

One of the most convincing proofs that the orans was regarded as a symbol of the soul is an ancient lead medal in the Vatican Museum showing the martyr St. Lawrence, under torture, while his soul, in the form of a female orans, is just leaving the body. An arcosolium in the Ostrianum cemetery represents an orans with a petition for her intercession: Victoriæ Virgini … Pete … The Acts of St. Cecilia speaks of souls leaving the body like virgins: Vidit egredientes animas eorum de corporibus, quasi virgines de thalamo ("He saw their souls coming out of their bodies, like virgins from the chamber"), and so also the Acts of Sts. Peter and Marcellinus.

Very probably the medieval representations of a diminutive body, figure of the soul, issuing from the mouths of the dying were reminiscences of the orans as a symbol of the soul. The earlier orantes were depicted in the simplest garb, and without any striking individual traits, but in the fourth century the figures become richly adorned, and of marked individuality, an indication of the approach of historic art. One of the most remarkable figures of the orans cycle, dating from the early fourth century, is interpreted by Wilpert as the Blessed Virgin interceding for the friends of the deceased. Directly in front of Mary is a boy, not in the orans attitude and supposed to be the Divine Child, while to the right and left are monograms of Christ.

The Platytéra, a hagiographic depiction on the Virgin Mary as Our Lady of the Sign which is standing in the orans gesture, usually placed on the half-dome above the altar of Byzantine-style churches, and facing down the nave.

Some orans-type Eastern Orthodox icons of the Virgin Mary

See also
 Panagia
 Worship

References

Sources

External links
 Including an orans mural from Lullingstone Roman Villa, now in the British Museum
 Why do we extend our arms when praying the Our Father and at other times during the Maronite anaphora?

Christian prayer
Christian iconography
Eastern Orthodox icons
Gestures of respect
Christian terminology